The Sigma 30mm 1.4 EX DC HSM is a wide-aperture photographic lens made by the Sigma Corporation, equipped with a Hyper Sonic Motor (abbreviated HSM, Sigma's trade name for photo lens focusing technology using ultrasonic motor). The lens was produced in Canon EF mount, Four Thirds System, Nikon F-mount, Pentax K mount, the SA mount, and the Sony/Minolta AF Mount varieties, all of the same optical formula. It shipped with a removable petal-type lens hood (62mm diameter). The lens assumes a crop factor of roughly 1.5, and therefore is not usable with on full-frame or 135 film cameras.

In 2013, Sigma announced that the lens would be replaced by a redesigned model designated as the Sigma 30mm 1.4 DC HSM A; the new lens went on sale in March of that year in Canon, Nikon, and Sigma mounts.

Its large aperture allows for a shallow depth of field, allowing good isolation of close subjects. On APS-C sensor cameras, its field of view equivalent to that of a 46mm lens (Nikon DX, Pentax, Sony, current Sigma bodies), 48mm lens (Canon), 51mm lens (older Sigma bodies) or 60mm lens (Four Thirds). On the Four-Thirds mount, it is the only affordable normal, large aperture lens, therefore it is popular lens on that format.

Optical properties 

The Sigma 30mm 1.4 EX DC HSM lens has unusual optical properties. With most photographic lenses, vignetting is drastically reduced by stopping down the aperture by about 1 f-stop. This lens has a more linear response to stopping down the aperture. To reduce vignetting by about one half, it is required to stop down the aperture by over 3 full f-stops. The optical resolution properties of this lens are also unique. Most lenses are typically sharp in the center of the image frame, and softer in the edges. This problem is typically solved by stopping down the lens. This lens has little response to such an effort. When stopped down by over 4 stops, the edges of the frame are still soft. However, the center resolution of the lens is high when used wide open, and becomes exceedingly high when the lens is stopped down.

See also
List of Nikon compatible lenses with integrated autofocus-motor
Sigma 30mm F1.4 DC DN - lens of a different optical formula; optimized for Sony E-mount and Micro Four Thirds.

References & External links

 Sigma 30mm F1.4 EX DC HSM page on the corporate website.
 Sigma 30mm F1.4 EX DC HSM image samples on pbase.com

External links

030mm f/1.4 EX DC HSM
Camera lenses introduced in 2006
Sigma 30 1.4 EX